In Fijian mythology, Bulu (pronounced: Mbúlu) is a name for the 'world of spirits' (presumably the underworld). In the month called Vula-i-Ratumaibulu, the god Ratumaibulu comes from Bulu, the world of spirits, to make the breadfruit and other fruit trees blossom and yield fruit. Ratumaibulu is a god of great importance who presides over agriculture.

Another source refers to a "place called 'Nabagatai' on the road to 'Bulu', the separate state or land of souls".

The most westerly point of the island of Vanua Levu was the place from which the departed spirits started out for Bulu, the eternal abode of the blessed (Freese 2005:70).

See also
Burotu
Pulotu

Notes

References
Journal of the Royal Astronomical Society of Canada, 1907.
John Freese, The Philosophy of the Immortality of the Soul and the Resurrection of the Human Body. Facsimile reprint of 1864 edition. Kessinger Publishing, 2005, .
T. Williams, J. Calvert, Fiji and the Fijians, Heylin, 1858.

Fijian mythology
Afterlife places
Underworld